Changeling, in comics, may refer to:

Beast Boy, a DC Comics superhero who used the codename "Changeling" for a period during his membership in the Teen Titans
Changeling (Marvel Comics), a supervillain who later joined the X-Men

See also
Changeling (disambiguation)